GDCI may refer to:

 Goderich District Collegiate Institute
 Gasoline Direct Injection Compression Ignition, also known as Partially premixed combustion